Poland participated at the 2010 Winter Olympics in Vancouver, British Columbia, Canada.

Medalists

Alpine skiing

Biathlon 

Men

Women

Women's relay

Paulina Bobak was a member of the biathlon team, but did not participate in any event.

Bobsleigh

Cross-country skiing 

Men

Women

Figure skating 

Poland  has qualified 1 entrant in men's singles, 1 in ladies singles, and 1 in pair skating, for a total of 4 athletes.

Freestyle skiing 

Ski cross

Luge

Short track speed skating

Ski jumping 

Men

Snowboarding 

Halfpipe

Snowboard Cross

Speed skating 

Men

Women

Team Pursuit

References 

2010 in Polish sport
Nations at the 2010 Winter Olympics
2010